Max Dwinger may refer to:

 Max Dwinger (fencer born 1870), a Dutch Olympic fencer
 Max Dwinger (fencer born 1943), a Dutch Olympic fencer and grandson of the above fencer